The 1939 Upper Hunter state by-election was held on 7 October 1939 for the New South Wales Legislative Assembly electorate of Upper Hunter because of the death of Malcolm Brown. There were three candidates endorsed by the Country Party.

Dates

Results

Malcolm Brown died.

See also
Electoral results for the district of Upper Hunter
List of New South Wales state by-elections

References

1939 elections in Australia
New South Wales state by-elections
1930s in New South Wales